Rex Terp (born 13 March 1970) is an Australian former professional rugby league footballer who played for St. George and Illawarra Steelers. He played his football in the backline, as a centre and winger.

Playing career
Terp, who comes from the New South Wales town of Wauchope, spent a season in England playing for Leeds in 1989/90, before embarking on a career in the NSWRL.

From 1991 to 1994 he played first-grade for the St. George Dragons and was on the bench for the club's 1992 and 1993 grand final losses to Brisbane.

He played for Illawarra in the 1995 ARL season, before suffering a knee injury which restricted him to three first-grade appearances.

During his time in the NSWRL/ARL he continued to work as a postman, the job he had held in Wauchope.

References

External links
Rex Terp at Rugby League project

1970 births
Living people
Australian rugby league players
Illawarra Steelers players
Leeds Rhinos players
Rugby league centres
Rugby league players from Wauchope, New South Wales
Rugby league wingers
St. George Dragons players